Jimi Constantine (born Konstantinos Jorma Hiekkanen, 31 December 1981) is a Finnish musician and actor. He was previously the vocalist and guitarist of the band Technicolour. He has also played with the bands Tyrävyö, Cliché, and Kalle Päätalo. His previous artist name was Jimi Pääkallo. Constantine is also an actor, having appeared in the films A Long Hot Summer (1999), Pearls and Pigs (2003), and 8 Days to Premiere (2008), as well as the TV series Kallio (2010) and Salatut elämät (Secret Lives) (2000/2011).

Jimi was the primary songwriter in the band Technicolour and he has also composed music for Cristal Snow, Robin Packalen, Princess Avenue, and numerous Russian and Latvian artists. He has also produced songs for Pekko Haimin and Aikakone. He has collaborated with artists including Cheek, Uniikki, and Flowboysfamin, and contributed music to numerous film and television soundtracks.

In 2008, Jimi participated in the Tanssii tähtien kanssa (Dancing with the Stars) competition, Finland's version of the British show Strictly Come Dancing, and Suomen Pelkokerroin, the Finnish version of Fear Factor. He also took part in the 2011 Eurovision Song Contest with his song "Party to Party", but did not qualify.

Jimi's father, Markus Hiekkanen, is an archaeologist and medieval scholar.

Constantine is a vegetarian. He has a large octopus tattooed on his left hand, two black ribbons around his right wrist, and a smaller octopus on his chest.

He founded his own record label, JCR Constant Music Oy.

Discography

Solo
Studio albums
 Elämä Suomessa (2017)

Singles
 "Dirty Cinderella" (2010)
 "Party to Party" (2010)
 "Beautiful Things" (2011)
 "Rakkauden Nimeen" (2017)

Other contributions
 Pearls and Pigs (2003)
 Kallio (2010)
 Uuden Musiikin Kilpailu (2016)
 Nieminen & Lahtinen Show (2016)
 Vain elämää (2017)
 Kingi (2018)

Technicolour
Studio albums
 Way Out (2003)
 Only Shadows Dance (2005)
 People (2006)

Tyrävyö
Studio albums
 Helminauha (1999)
 Tyrävyö (2001)
 Pelkoa, inhoa ja b-luokan elokuvaa (2002)
 Lähempänä pohjaa (2005)
 Elämänpaneeli (2015)

EPs
 Kavereita (1999)
 Uskoin niin (2002)

Cliché
Studio albums
 Twilightin (2000)

References

External links
 Jimi Pääkallo on IMDb
 Jimi Constantine on Myspace

1981 births
Living people
Finnish male musicians
21st-century guitarists
21st-century male musicians